Demodex conicus is a hair follicle mite found in the ear canal of the house mouse, Mus musculus.

References

Trombidiformes
Animals described in 2015